Gangathura Mohambry Naicker (30 September 1910 – 12 January 1978) was a medical doctor and a South African anti-apartheid activist of Indian Tamil descent.

Early life
His father was a trader, exporting bananas. He studied in Durban at Marine College and then at the age of 17 went to Britain to finish high school, and he then studied medicine at the University of Edinburgh.

Anti-Apartheid Activism
Naicker was a leading member of South African Indian Congress (SAIC) and the Natal Indian Congress. In 1946 he and Yusuf Dadoo led passive resistance campaigns among Indian South Africans to protest the Asiatic Land Tenure and the Indian Representation Act. Along with Yusuf Dadoo of the Transvaal Indian Congress he visited India, where he received support for the endeavours of the South African Indians from Mahatma Gandhi and other Indian leaders in 1947.

Naicker was an early advocate for a multi-racial united front against apartheid. He worked to develop an alliance with the African National Congress (ANC) in 1947, known as the Dadoo-Naicker-Xuma Pact, or the Three Doctors' Pact.   

Naicker was imprisoned numerous times for anti-apartheid activism. In 1948 he and Yusuf Dadoo were sentenced to six months hard labour under the Immigrant Regulation Act. He was jailed for a month after participating the Defiance campaign of 1952. During the 1950s Naicker was president of the SAIC for at least two terms, despite being forbidden to attend gatherings by the Apartheid government in 1953. Naicker was one of the accused in the Treason Trial of 1956-1961 but the charges against him and several other co-defendants were dropped in 1958. Between 1956 and 1973 he was regularly banned, which limited his political activities.

Sources

External links
ANC biography
Don't support apartheid sport: Appeal by Chief A. J. Lutuli and Dr. G. M. Naicker 1962
 The African Activist Archive Project website has a 1956 photograph of Mary-Louise Hooper and Monty Naicker at the Treason Trial.

1910 births
1978 deaths
South African people of Tamil descent
African National Congress politicians
People acquitted of treason
South African prisoners and detainees
Prisoners and detainees of South Africa
Alumni of the University of Edinburgh
People from Durban
South African politicians of Indian descent
Members of the Order of Luthuli

Anti-apartheid activists
People from eThekwini Metropolitan Municipality